The Silva-Coroner was a French automobile manufactured only in 1927.  Built by a M. Silva-Coroner, they were overhead valve straight-eight-engined cars of 2490 cubic centre metre capacity.

References
David Burgess Wise, The New Illustrated Encyclopedia of Automobiles.

Defunct motor vehicle manufacturers of France